Krzywcza is a village in Przemyśl County, Subcarpathian Voivodeship, in south-eastern Poland. It is the seat of the gmina (administrative district) called Gmina Krzywcza.

The village has an approximate population of 600.

References

Krzywcza